Mary Watson-Wentworth, Marchioness of Rockingham (1735 – 19 December 1804) was the wife of Charles Watson-Wentworth, 2nd Marquess of Rockingham, who was prime minister of Great Britain in 1782 and again from 1765 to 1766.

Early life
Born  in Pontefract, West Yorkshire, England, she was the only child and heiress of Thomas Liddell, Lord of the Manor of Ecclesall, South Yorkshire, and Margaret Norton. She was baptized at Ackworth, West Yorkshire, on 27 August 1735. She and her father were both born with the surname Liddell, but her father took the surname Bright when he inherited Badsworth Hall from his father John Bright.

Marriage
On 26 February, 1752, Lady Liddell married Whig politician Charles Watson-Wentworth. They were married until Watson-Wentworth's death on 1 July 1782.

References

External links

Marchionesses
Burials at York Minster
Mary
Spouses of prime ministers of the United Kingdom
1735 births
1804 deaths